Naussac is the name of two communes in France:

 Naussac, in the Aveyron department
 Naussac, in the Lozère department